Francesca Jones (born 19 September 2000) is a British tennis player.

Jones has a career-high singles ranking of 149 by the Women's Tennis Association (WTA).
She had a career-high ITF juniors ranking of 31, achieved on 1 May 2017.

She was born with a thumb and three fingers on each hand, and with only seven toes, as a result of a rare genetic condition, Ectrodactyly Ectodermal Dysplasia (EED).

Jones, not related to former Wimbledon champion Ann Jones, started playing tennis at the age of five, after being enrolled at a tennis camp.

Grand Slam singles performance timeline

ITF Circuit finals

Singles: 10 (6 titles, 4 runner–ups)

Doubles: 1 (runner–up)

References

External links
 
 

2000 births
Living people
English female tennis players
Sportspeople from Leeds
Sportspeople from Bradford
Sportspeople with disabilities
People educated at Bradford Girls' Grammar School
British female tennis players